Misumessus oblongus is a species of crab spider in the family Thomisidae. It is found in Canada and the United States.

References

External links

 

Thomisidae
Articles created by Qbugbot
Spiders described in 1880